Vellanki Nagineedu is an Indian actor who primarily works in Telugu and Tamil films. He was a general manager at Prasad Labs before S. S. Rajamouli offered him a role in his film Maryada Ramanna. He won Nandi Award for Best Villain for his role.

Filmography

Film

Television

References

External links
 

Telugu male actors
Nandi Award winners
Living people
21st-century Indian male actors
Male actors in Telugu cinema
Indian male film actors
Indian male actors
Year of birth missing (living people)